Svante Björck is a Swedish Quaternary geologist and professor emeritus active at Lund University. In 2006 he was named Geologist of the Year by Geosektionen of Naturvetarna.

References

21st-century Swedish geologists
Swedish geographers
Quaternary geologists
Living people
Members of the Royal Swedish Academy of Sciences
Academic staff of Lund University
Year of birth missing (living people)
20th-century Swedish geologists